Tomasz Karol Borkowy (born 17 September 1952, Warsaw, Poland) is a Polish actor, but has been working in the United Kingdom since the early 1980s. He often works under the name Tomek Bork and has had many film and television appearances.

He graduated from Theatre college in Kraków in 1977 and first came to the UK the following year, unable to speak English. Before this he had appeared in a number of Polish TV series and films. In 1980 he moved to the UK permanently to continue his career. Since then he has appeared in the films The Unbearable Lightness of Being, Murder on the Moon and Tailspin: Behind the Korean Airliner Tragedy. Notable television appearances have included Doctor Who (The Curse of Fenric), The Bill, Love Hurts, Sleepers, Lovejoy and most recently, Doctors. He has also continued to work in Poland, where he is most well known for playing the lead role in the TV drama series, Dom (House) which ran for 7 series over 20 years (1980–2000). Borkowy has also starred in and produced a number of plays at the Edinburgh Festival Fringe for the past 18 years.

Borkowy now lives in Edinburgh, Scotland and southern Spain. He runs Universal Arts – an international agency and production company for performing arts, while still working as an actor.

Filmography

References

External links 

Tomek Bork's Universal Arts' website
Translated Biography at Film Polski.pl

1952 births
Male actors from Warsaw
Living people
Polish male television actors
Polish male stage actors
20th-century Polish male actors
21st-century Polish male actors